Pronair was a charter airline based in Albacete, Spain.

History
Pronair was established in 2007 beginning with air taxi services. Shortly thereafter its projects became more ambitious, operating domestic and international services from its base at Albacete Airport. The airline ceased operations in 2009.

Fleet
The Pronair fleet included the following aircraft (as of September 2008):

1 Boeing 747-200F (Cargo division)
2 McDonnell Douglas MD-87

See also

List of defunct airlines of Spain

References

External links

Defunct airlines of Spain
Airlines established in 2007
Airlines disestablished in 2009
Defunct charter airlines